Bajo Aragón is a Spanish geographical indication for Vino de la Tierra wines located in and near Lower Aragon, in the autonomous region of Aragon. Vino de la Tierra is one step below the mainstream Denominación de Origen indication on the Spanish wine quality ladder.

The area covered by this geographical indication comprises about 50 municipalities in the province of Teruel (Aragon, Spain) and about 25 in the province of Zaragoza (Aragón, Spain).

It acquired its Vino de la Tierra status in 2006.

Grape varieties
 White: Macabeo, Chardonnay and Garnacha blanca
 Red: Mazuela, Cabernet Sauvignon, Merlot, Tempranillo, Garnacha tinta, Derechero and Syrah

References

Spanish wine
Wine regions of Spain
Aragonese cuisine
Geography of the Province of Zaragoza
Wine-related lists
Appellations